Sükhbaatar's Mausoleum was a mausoleum for Damdin Sükhbaatar, leader of the Mongolian Revolution of 1921, and Khorloogiin Choibalsan, leader of the Mongolian People's Republic from the late 1930s to his death in 1952, in Mongolia's capital Ulaanbaatar, on the northern side of Sükhbaatar Square in front of the Saaral Ordon. The building was erected after Choibalsan's death, and removed in 2005 to make place for a hall dedicated to Genghis Khan. The mausoleum resembled the shape of Lenin's Mausoleum but differed in color. The mausoleum has never been opened for public visits.

History

Construction and development
Sükhbaatar had been buried at the Altan-Ölgii National Cemetery in 1923, but was exhumed and reinterred into the mausoleum the following year. In the 30s it was rebuilt, turning into an almost exact copy of the Lenin's Mausoleum. In 1952, the body of Marshal Choibalsan was placed in the mausoleum. The last version of the mausoleum was built in 1954. On May 9, 1952, a resolution of the Politburo of the Central Committee of the Mongolian People's Revolutionary Party was issued, according to which the sketch of a new mausoleum of Choibalsan and Sükhbaatar by architect B. Chimed was approved. According to this sketch, the tribune on the mausoleum was 14.3 meters long and 13.87 centimeters wide. Inside the mausoleum, the walls were decorated with small stones, and the outside was decorated with white marble. Specialists from the USSR were invited to build the mausoleum, and marble was brought from the valley of the Orkhon River in the city of Kharkhorin. The Chief of the General Staff of the People's Army, Colonel General Zhamyangiyn Lhagvasuren was responsible for the renovation works at the mausoleum, with soldiers of the Construction and Engineering Forces of the Mongolian People's Army taking part in the construction effort. On July 8, 1954, the grand opening of the mausoleum took place, with this day being declared a holiday. Cadets of military universities marched in front of the newly renovated mausoleum.

1954–2005
Since 1954, during the parades on International Workers Day, the Day of the People's Revolution of 1921 and October Revolution Day, the leadership of the country came to the podium of mausoleum and greeted the people. For this, a resolution of the Central Committee of the MPRP was issued on April 2, 1955, keeping this tradition until the 1990s. Notable persons have also visited the mausoleum during its existence, including Leonid Brezhnev, Mikhail Suslov and Wojciech Jaruzelski. Security at the mausoleum from 1951-1956 was provided by 10 soldiers allocated by the special security company, who guarded the structure.  Beginning 1956, security and cleaning at the structure was the responsibility of the commandant's office of the State Residence. In 1971 and 1980s, repair work was carried out, with Soviet specialists who worked in the Lenin Mausoleum as well as specialists from Ulan-Ude being invited to serve as overseers.

Destruction and exhumation
The mausoleum stood until 2005, at which point it was demolished in order to make room for the construction of an extension to the State Residence and a monument to Chinggis Khaan. By that time, more than 20 political parties had come out in favor of the reburial of the country's former leaders. The corpses of both rulers were again exhumed, cremated, and the ashes entombed at Altan Ölgii cemetery in 2005, under supervision of the Buddhist clergy.

See also 
 Georgi Dimitrov Mausoleum, Bulgarian mausoleum which met a similar fate.
 National Monument at Vítkov
 Agostinho Neto's Mausoleum

References

External links 
 
 Cremation of old ruler's bodies

Mausoleums in Mongolia
Monuments and memorials in Mongolia
Buildings and structures in Ulaanbaatar
Buildings and structures demolished in 2005
Demolished buildings and structures in Mongolia